Punta Huete Airport  is an airport located in the municipality of San Francisco Libre in Managua, Nicaragua. The airport is in a sparsely populated section of the municipality. The nearest town is San Benito,  to the east.

In 2010, a new VOR was installed on the field.

History
The Punta Huete Airport was built in the 80's for the landing of MiG 21 airplanes. After Humberto Ortega revealed that Nicaragua had approached France and the Soviet Union for Mirage or MiG fighter planes, the United States warned against introducing modern combat jets to the region. Although Nicaragua began construction of the new airbase with a longer runway and protective revetments, it did not succeed in acquiring new fighter aircraft.

In 2010, the airfield was renovated as a weather alternate for the Managua Airport. Located at the north shore of Lake Managua, the Punta Huete Airport could become a major airport in Nicaragua. The  runway allows the landing of all types of aircraft, including large airplanes such as the Boeing 747.

See also

 List of airports in Nicaragua
 Transport in Nicaragua

References

External links
OpenStreetMap - Punta Huete Airport
OurAirports - Punta Huete Airport

Airports in Nicaragua
Managua Department